Philip Armes (15 August 1836 – 10 February 1908) was an English organist, notably holding posts at Rochester, Chichester and Durham Cathedral.

Musical career
Armes was a chorister at the cathedral of his native city, Norwich, between 1846–48, under Zechariah Buck. He then became a chorister at Rochester Cathedral where his father sang bass in the choir, from 1848–50. He was an articled pupil of John Larkin Hopkins, organist of Rochester Cathedral.

He transitioned from a chorister to assistant organist at Rochester in 1850. In 1854 he became organist of Trinity Church, Milton, Kent, where he worked until 1857. He spent four years as organist of St Andrew's Church, Wells Street, London before he became Organist and Master of the Choristers at Chichester Cathedral in 1861. Following the collapse of the cathedral's central tower and spire, Armes moved to the more lucrative Organist position at Durham Cathedral, in 1862, a post he held for 45 years.

Armes taught in the music department at Durham University, was resident examiner from 1890 and became Professor of Music there in 1897.

He had married, in 1864, Emily Jane, the daughter of Sir Henry Davison, Chief Justice of the Madras High Court; they had two sons, Augustus and Algernon, and two daughters, Emily and Alice.

Armes died on 10 February 1908 in North Bailey, Durham, and is buried in Bow Cemetery, Durham.

Academic qualifications
Bachelor of Music (Oxon, 1858) 
Master of Arts (Dunelm) 
Doctor of Music (Oxon, 1864)
Doctor of Music (Dunelm, 1874)
Fellow of the Royal College of Organists
Honorary Royal Academy of Music

Works
Armes wrote oratorios, church music, madrigals, psalm chants and organ pieces. In 1901 he delivered a lecture at Manchester on Double Counterpoint, Imitation, and Canon.

Anthems 

 Give ear, O ye heavens
 I will sing a new song
 O send out thy light
 Rejoice in the Lord, O ye righteous
 The Lord preserveth the souls of his saints
 We wait for thy loving-kindness

Hymn tunes 
Two hymn tunes, Galilee (LM) and St. Bede (8.7.8.7.8.7) appear in Hymns Ancient and Modern. Other hymn tunes he wrote include Armes (SM) and Obedience (7.7.7.7), as well as other un-named tunes.

Madrigal/ part-song 

 Angels' Music

Oratorios 

 Hezekiah (1878)
 St. John the Evangelist (1881)
 St. Barnabas (1891, Durham Cathedral)

Organ 

 Introduction and Fugue
 Pastorale

Services 

 Communion Service in A
 Communion Service in B-flat (Unison)
 Preces, Responses, Litany and latter Suffrages

See also
Organs and organists of Chichester Cathedral
Durham University Department of Music

References

1836 births
1908 deaths
Cathedral organists
English organists
British male organists
Musicians from Norwich
Organists & Masters of the Choristers of Chichester Cathedral
Academics of Durham University
19th-century classical musicians
19th-century British male musicians
Oratorio composers
Male classical organists
19th-century organists